Vasek Pospisil and Jack Sock were the defending champions, but lost in the third round to Jamie Murray and John Peers. Jean-Julien Rojer and Horia Tecău won the title by defeating Murray and Peers in the final by a score of 7–6(7–5), 6–4, 6–4.

Seeds

Qualifying

Draw

Finals

Top half

Section 1

Section 2

Bottom half

Section 3

Section 4

References

 Main draw
2015 Wimbledon Championships – Men's draws and results at the International Tennis Federation

Men's Doubles
Wimbledon Championship by year – Men's doubles